Tüzer See is a lake in the Mecklenburgische Seenplatte district in Mecklenburg-Vorpommern, Germany. At an elevation of 51.5 m, its surface area is ca. 0.25 km².

Lakes of Mecklenburg-Western Pomerania